USS Sargent Bay (CVE-83) was a  of the United States Navy. She was named after Sargent Bay, located within Revillagigedo Island, and was built for service during World War II. Launched in January 1944, and commissioned in March 1944, she served in support of the Invasion of Iwo Jima and the Battle of Okinawa. Postwar, she participated in Operation Magic Carpet. She was decommissioned in June 1946, when she was mothballed in the Atlantic Reserve Fleet. Ultimately, she was sold for scrapping in July 1959.

Design and description

Sargent Bay was a Casablanca-class escort carrier, the most numerous type of aircraft carriers ever built, and designed specifically to be mass-produced using prefabricated sections, in order to replace heavy early war losses. She displaced  standard,  with a full load. She was powered with two Skinner Unaflow reciprocating steam engines, which drove two shafts, providing , thus enabling her to make . Her compact size necessitated the installment of an aircraft catapult at her bow, and there were two aircraft elevators to facilitate movement of aircraft between the flight and hangar deck: one each fore and aft.

One /38 caliber dual-purpose gun was mounted on the stern. Anti-aircraft defense was provided by eight  Bofors anti-aircraft guns in single mounts, as well as twelve  Oerlikon cannons, which were mounted around the perimeter of the deck. By the end of the war, Casablanca-class carriers had been modified to carry thirty 20-mm cannons, and the amount of 40-mm guns had been doubled to sixteen, by putting them into twin mounts. These modifications were in response to increasing casualties due to kamikaze attacks. Casablanca-class escort carriers were designed to carry 27 aircraft, but the hangar deck could accommodate more. For example, during the Invasion of Iwo Jima, she carried 20 FM-2 fighters, and 12 TBM-1C torpedo bombers, for a total of 32  aircraft. During the Battle of Okinawa, she carried 18 FM-2 fighters, 10 TBM-1C variant torpedo bombers, and 3 TBM-3 variant torpedo bombers, for a total of 31 aircraft.

Construction
Her construction was awarded to Kaiser Shipbuilding Company, Vancouver, Washington under a Maritime Commission contract, on 18 June 1942, under the name Didrickson Bay, as part of a tradition which named escort carriers after bays or sounds in Alaska. The escort carrier was laid down on 8 November 1943, under a Maritime Commission contract, MC hull 1120, by Kaiser Shipbuilding Company, Vancouver, Washington. She was launched on 31 January 1944; sponsored by Mrs. Edith W. DeBaun; transferred to the United States Navy and commissioned on 9 March 1944, with Captain William Theodore Rassieur in command.

Service history

Upon being commissioned, Sargent Bay underwent a shakedown cruise down the West Coast to San Diego. She then underwent a transport mission, ferrying P-47 Thunderbolts of the 333rd Fighter Squadron, 318th Fighter Group to Saipan. She unloaded her cargo on 18 July, and reported to the 3rd Fleet at Pearl Harbor on 17 August. The next day, she departed, bound for Eniwetok and Manus Island. On 6 November, she left Manus, assigned to Task Group 30.8 (Fleet Oiler and Transport Carrier Group) on the first of four tours with replenishment groups operating off the Philippines. She provided air cover and support for the vulnerable oilers which supplied the frontline fast carrier groups with fuel and replacement aircraft, enabling them to operate out at sea for long periods of time. During this time period, Sargent Bay was based out of Ulithi. She remained on this duty until 27 January 1945, staying out at sea in two to four week increments.

In February 1945, Sargent Bay was assigned to Task Group 52.2, the escort carrier group responsible for providing air cover in preparation for the Invasion of Iwo Jima. Along five other carriers, she operated under the command of Rear Admiral Clifton Sprague, in Carrier Division 26. Her air contingent provided artillery spotting and close air support for the marines struggling through the island, and she also conducted aircraft screening for the task group, as well as anti-submarine patrols. She continued operations until 11 March, when she retired along with her task group.

Sargent Bay was only out of action for a short period of time, as she joined Task Group 52.1.1, the escort carrier force assigned to support the planned Battle of Okinawa. Under the command of Rear Admiral Felix Stump, she began operations off of Okinawa on 25 March. She provided many of the same duties as she did during the Invasion of Iwo Jima, including conducting anti-aircraft patrols. Notably, on the late evening of 3 April, her fighters shot down one of a pair of kamikazes attempting to approach the escort carriers. Anti-aircraft fire from the destroyer  brought down the other kamikaze. On 7 April, she traded places with the escort carrier , as she briefly left to join the Logistics Support Group, before returning to the strike force on 18 April. She left again on 15 May, for repairs at Guam. She rejoined operations over Okinawa on 2 June, before finally retiring from the operation on 20 June.

Proceeding south, she arrived off of Leyte on 23 June, and spent the next month performing upkeep. She then sailed for the United States, arriving at San Pedro on 9 August for repairs and overhaul. There, news of the Japanese surrender broke. After completing overhaul, she joined the Operation Magic Carpet fleet, which repatriated U.S. servicemen from around the Pacific. During the month of October, she made two runs, transporting personnel from Hawaii. She then conducted a run to Eniwetok, and a final run to Okinawa, finishing her duties before the New Year.

Passing through the Panama Canal, Sargent Bay arrived at Boston on 23 March 1946 for inactivation. She was decommissioned on 23 June, and subsequently stored at the South Boston Naval Annex, where she was mothballed as part of the Atlantic Reserve Fleet. She was reclassified CVU-83 on 12 June 1955. She was struck from the Navy list on 27 June 1958, and she was sold on 30 July 1959 to J.C. Berkwitt Co., New York. She was ultimately broken up in Antwerp, Belgium, starting September 1959.

References

Sources

Online sources

Bibliography

External links 

 

 

Casablanca-class escort carriers
World War II escort aircraft carriers of the United States
Ships built in Vancouver, Washington
1944 ships
S4-S2-BB3 ships